The 2014–15 Alabama Crimson Tide men's basketball team represents the University of Alabama in the 2014–15 college basketball season. The Crimson Tide, led by second year head coach Kristy Curry, played their games at Foster Auditorium with two games at Coleman Coliseum and were members of the Southeastern Conference. They finished the season 13–19, 2–14 in SEC play to finish in last place. They lost in the first round of the SEC women's tournament to Vanderbilt.

Roster

Schedule

|-
!colspan=9 style="background:#990000; color:#FFFFFF;"| Exhibition

|-
!colspan=9 style="background:#990000; color:#FFFFFF;"| Regular Season

|-
!colspan=12 style="text-align: center; background:#990000"|2015 SEC Tournament

See also
2014–15 Alabama Crimson Tide men's basketball team

References

Alabama
Alabama Crimson Tide women's basketball seasons
Alabama Crimson Tide
Alabama Crimson Tide